Jérôme Hanquez (11 March 1974 – 17 March 2020) was a French professional tennis player.

Biography
Hanquez was born in the Northern French town of Campagne-lès-Hesdin and started playing tennis at the age of nine. He had a win over Yevgeny Kafelnikov as a junior, when he made the round of 16 in the boys' singles at the 1992 French Open.

From 1994, he competed professionally and went on to appear in the main draw of five ATP Tour tournaments, including two at Lyon. He reached the final round of qualifying at the 1997 French Open but had to retire hurt during his match against Ramón Delgado.

As a doubles player he was an ATP Tour quarter-finalist once, at the 1999 Grand Prix de Tennis de Toulouse, with Nicolas Escudé. He and Régis Lavergne won the doubles title at the Contrexeville Challenger in 1999.

Hanquez died on 17 March 2020.

Challenger titles

Doubles: (1)

References

External links
 
 

1974 births
2020 deaths
French male tennis players
Place of death missing
Sportspeople from Pas-de-Calais